66 Banbury Road is a detached Victorian villa in North Oxford built in 1869 by Frederick Codd.  The villa is one of the largest structures in the suburb and is particularly distinctive due to its prominent site on the corner of Banbury and Norham Roads and its tall 6-story Italianate tower, which is a local landmark.

Originally named 'St Catherine's', the house, which sits in a one-acre plot, was first leased to Mrs Catherine Fry, in 1874.  Mrs Fry occupied the house from its construction to 1894.  Early 20th century residents included Dr and Mrs A.A. Prankerd of Manchester College.

In 1930 Wolsey Hall, Oxford acquired No.66 and operated their home tutoring business from the site.  This marked the end of the building's residential use and its permanent transition to institutional purposes.  As at 2019, No.66 is home to the Oxford English Centre and the University of Oxford Institute of Population Ageing.

In 2008, No.66 was designated a Grade II listed building.

References

Victorian architecture in England
Grade II listed buildings in Oxford
Buildings and structures of the University of Oxford